(Lucius) Alexander Plantagenet Cary, Master of Falkland (born 1 February 1963), is an English screenwriter, producer, and ex-soldier.

Life and career 
Cary was born in Hammersmith, London, to Lucius Cary, 15th Viscount of Falkland, and Caroline Butler. His father is an elected hereditary peer, and Cary is next in line to be Viscount of Falkland, the senior viscountcy of Scotland (created in 1620 by Scottish King James VI).

Cary grew up in Chelsea, London, where his neighbours were actors André Morell and Joan Greenwood. He knew from the age of twelve that he wanted to work in the film industry. He was initially educated at Westminster School, but was expelled before his A-levels, and sent instead to Loretto in Scotland. He left with unremarkable grades and, after a brief stint as a runner in a New York theatre, joined the army on a whim: "I had a bet with a friend who didn't think I could do it, but I loved it. Having been a total pain in the neck about authority at school, I took a perverse enjoyment in being given instructions and carrying them out."

He graduated from Sandhurst Military Academy in 1985 and was commissioned as an officer into the Scots Guards. He was posted to Northern Ireland during the height of the Troubles. He saw active service during the Gulf War, in which he was attached to a company of United States Marines.

He left the military shortly after the war, and went to Hollywood to pursue a career as a screenwriter. After a decade of little success, he achieved a spot in the writers' room for the first series of Lie to Me in 2009. He later became a writer and producer for Homeland, and has also worked on The Riches and In Plain Sight.

On 23 July 1993, Cary married American actress Linda Purl, with whom he has a son, Lucius (born 6 February 1995). He also has son Sebastian (born c. 2004) from another relationship. Purl and Cary later divorced.

In 2013, he became engaged to American actress Jennifer Marsala, a cast member in Homeland. The marriage took place in Somerset on 31 December 2013.

He appeared in the BBC programme The Gift on 10 February 2015, in which he met a fellow ex-soldier who wished to thank him for saving his life.

References

External links 
 
 "You can all relax, Brody is back and taking centre stage in Homeland". Tim Walker for The London Evening Standard. 29 November 2013.
 "Real hero of Homeland: writer and producer of hit US show saved soldier's life after IRA mortar attack". Stephen Gordon for The Belfast Telegraph. 9 February 2015.

1963 births
Living people
People educated at Westminster School, London
People educated at Loretto School, Musselburgh
Scottish screenwriters
Scots Guards officers
Alexander